Aisam-ul-Haq Qureshi and Rajeev Ram were the defending champions but Ram chose not to participate and Qureshi chose to compete in Båstad instead.

Jonathan Erlich and Artem Sitak won the title, defeating Marcelo Arévalo and Miguel Ángel Reyes-Varela in the final, 6–1, 6–2.

Seeds

Draw

Draw

References 
 Draw

Doubles